Nour Odeh is a Palestinian political analyst, activist, researcher, public diplomacy consultant, journalist, author and former spokesperson to Palestinian Authority. She was notably Palestine's first ever female government spokesperson. She is the founding member and committee member of the Democratic National Assembly of Palestine. She is a 1999 graduate of Golden Gate University in San Francisco.

Career 
Odeh has been an independent media professional communications consultant and freelance journalist for over 20 years. She also worked as the Al Jazeera English network's senior correspondent for the West Bank for five years from 2006 to 2011. Additionally, she has served as a senior communications consultant and public relations advisor to the Palestinian government. In 2012, she was appointed Palestinian Authority spokesperson and thus became the first Palestinian women in that role. She was a candidate of Palestinian Legislative Council for the 2012–13 Palestinian local elections. She has also appeared as a regular guest in various international news outlets such as Al Jazeera.

References 

Living people
Year of birth missing (living people)
Palestinian women journalists
Palestinian activists
Palestinian women in politics